Rhodomela confervoides is a species of alga belonging to the family Rhodomelaceae.

It has cosmopolitan distribution.

References

Rhodomelaceae